The Embassy of Sri Lanka in Seoul is the diplomatic mission of Sri Lanka to South Korea.  the ambassador was Tissa Wijeratne, a retired Foreign Service officer. After the retirement of the ambassador Tissa Wijeratne, Manisha Gunasekera assumed duties as Sri Lanka's Ambassador to the Republic of Korea in September 2015.

References

External links
 

Sri Lanka
Seoul